Clavus angulatus is a species of sea snail, a marine gastropoda mollusk in the family Drilliidae.

Original description
      Stahlschmidt P., Poppe G.T. & Tagaro S.P. (2018). Descriptions of remarkable new turrid species from the Philippines. Visaya. 5(1): 5-64.
page(s): 14, pl. 9 figs 1–3.

References

External links

 Worms Link

angulatus